Britney Young (born 1987/1988) is an American actress, best known for her role as Carmen "Machu Picchu" Wade in GLOW.

Early life
Britney Young was born in Tokyo and raised in Eagle River, Alaska. Her father is African-American, and her mother is European-American. She has a bachelor's degree from the USC School of Cinematic Arts in Los Angeles.  In June 2018 she was interviewed by Glamour about overcoming childhood bullying and persistent Hollywood stereotypes.

Selected television

References

External links

1980s births
Date of birth missing (living people)
Actresses from Anchorage, Alaska
Actresses from Alaska
Actresses from Tokyo
African-American actresses
American film actresses
American television actresses
Living people
USC School of Cinematic Arts alumni
21st-century American actresses
21st-century African-American women
21st-century African-American people
20th-century African-American people
20th-century African-American women